The international cricket season in 2005–06 lasted from October 2005 to April 2006. The season included the ICC Super Series which was held in Australia.

Season overview

Rankings
The following are the rankings at the start of the season.

October 2005

ICC Super Series

New Zealand in South Africa

Sri Lanka in India

November 2005

West Indies in Australia

England in Pakistan

South Africa in India

December 2005

Australia in New Zealand

South Africa in Australia

Sri Lanka in New Zealand

January 2006

VB Series

India in Pakistan

February 2006

Asia Cup
The Asia Cup was postponed due to India's busy cricket schedule at the time.

West Indies in New Zealand

Sri Lanka in Bangladesh

Australia in South Africa

Kenya in Zimbabwe

March 2006

ICC Intercontinental Cup

England in India

Kenya in Bangladesh

Pakistan in Sri Lanka

April 2006

Australia in Bangladesh

New Zealand in South Africa (Test leg)

DLF Cup

References
 Australia A squad announced for Travelex Tour of Pakistan from Cricket Australia, published 11 August 2005, retrieved 1 September 2005
 The Cricinfo Archives 2005–06
 Kruger replaces Thomas in SA 'A' team from SuperCricket, published 25 August 2005, retrieved 1 September 2005
 Cricinfo – International Cricket Calendar – Yearly
 India to tour Pakistan next January – from rediff.com, published 7 May 2005, retrieved 1 September 2005

2005 in cricket
2006 in cricket